The Margaret River Pro 2016 was an event of the Association of Surfing Professionals for 2016 World Surf League.

This event was held from 15 to 26 April at Margaret River, Western Australia and contested by 36 surfers.

The tournament was won by Sebastian Zietz (HAW), who beat Julian Wilson (AUS) in final.

Round 1

Round 2

Round 3

Round 4

Round 5

Quarter finals

Semi finals

Final

References

2016 World Surf League
Margaret River Pro